David Pretrell "Trell" Kimmons (born July 13, 1985) is an American sprinter.

Career
At the 2004 World Junior Championships in Athletics, Kimmons was part of a Gold medal winning 4×100 meters relay squad that established a junior world record with 38.66 seconds. Kimmons attended Hinds Community College, where he won three individual national championships (200 m outdoor in 2005, 60 m and 200 m indoor in 2006) and set national championship indoor meet records at 60 m and 200 m. He committed to Mississippi State University in November 2005, but chose to turn pro in March 2006.

Kimmons finished fourth in the 60 meters at the 2010 IAAF World Indoor Championships with 6.59 seconds. At the 2010 USA Outdoor Track and Field Championships, he won a silver medal behind Walter Dix. At the 2010 Weltklasse Zürich meeting, he ran a new personal best of 9.95 seconds over 100 metres, becoming the 72nd person to break the 10-second barrier.

Kimmons finished second at the 2014 USA Indoor Track and Field Championships in the 60 metres and thus qualified for the 2014 IAAF World Indoor Championships.

Also a football player in high school, Kimmons caught 13 touchdown passes and made four interceptions during his senior year. He was rated a two-star recruit by Scout.com.

References

External links

DyeStat profile for Trell Kimmons
Trell Kimmons

1985 births
Living people
American male sprinters
People from Coldwater, Mississippi
Track and field athletes from Mississippi
Athletes (track and field) at the 2012 Summer Olympics
Olympic track and field athletes of the United States
Competitors stripped of Summer Olympics medals
USA Indoor Track and Field Championships winners